Partitive plural is a grammatical number that is used to modify a noun which represents a part of some whole amount, as opposed to the comprehensive plural, used when the noun represents the total amount of something. It is one of four grammatical numbers in Quenya, the others being singular, dual, and plural.

A similar meaning can be expressed by the partitive case in Finnish language (which influenced J.R.R. Tolkien in inventing his fictional language Quenya). One of its uses in Finnish is to express a part of a larger object, or a subset of a group of several objects.

An example in Finnish would be the difference between the use of partitive and accusative:

See also
Partitive

Grammar